Fred Sioa Chad Slade (born 8 January 1982) is a rugby union player for Oyonnax Rugby in the Top 14.

Notes 

1982 births
Living people
Exeter Chiefs players
Samoa international rugby union players
Samoan rugby union players
Samoan expatriate rugby union players
Expatriate rugby union players in England
Samoan expatriate sportspeople in England
Sportspeople from Apia
Rugby union number eights